The Basketball competition in the 2007 Summer Universiade were held on different venues in Bangkok, Thailand between 7–10 August 2007 and 12–18 August 2007.

Men's competition

Draw
Twenty-four (24) teams participated in the men's competition, drawn to eight groups of three. USA Basketball did not send a team to the event; instead, the University of Northern Iowa sent its team to compete under the country's banner.

Preliminary round (group stage)

Group A

Group B

Group C

Group D

Group E

Group F

Group G

Group H

Second phase (classification)
The top two teams in each group were placed into four (4) separate groups, and played another round-robin within the group. (Teams from Groups A & H formed Group I, B & G: Group J, C & F: Group K, and the remaining: Group L). The last place teams in groups A, C, E & H formed consolation Group M, the rest Group N, and also played another round-robin within.

The top two teams in the upper groups advanced to the quarterfinals. The others played teams with the same rank to determine 9th through 16th places. The top two teams in the lower groups played for the 17-20th places, and the rest for 21st-24th places.

Upper groups (groups I–L)

Group I

Group J

Group K

Group L

Lower groups (groups M & N)

Group I

Group N

Finals
Lithuanian team became the winner of the games, defeating Serbia in the final 85–66.

Women's competition
The gold medal in the women's competition was won by Australia. After dropping the opening game of the tournament, the Australians won five straight games, culminating in defeating Russia 85–65 in the gold medal game on 16 August.

References

Basketball
Summer Universiade
2007
Summer Universiade 2007
Summer Universiade 2007
Universiade